Camilo Ponce Enríquez (31 January 1912 in Quito – 13 September 1976) was an Ecuadorian political figure. He served as the 30th President of Ecuador between 1956 and 1960.  He was married to Dolores Marta Gracia de Gangotena y Jijón.

Ponce initially ran in the presidential election of 1948, but only came in third place. In 1951 Ponce, along with Sixto Durán Ballén, founded the Movimiento Social Cristiano (MSC), which later became the Partido Social Cristiano (PSC). In 1956 he won the presidential election and named Durán Ballén minister of public works. He ran a final time in the election of 1968, once again coming in third place.

See also
Camilo Ponce Enríquez Canton
Camilo Ponce Enríquez (parish)

References
Camilo Ponce Enriquez. munzinger.de
Dr. Camilo Ponce Enríquez. explored.com.ec

External links

 Official Website of the Ecuadorian Government about the country President's History

1912 births
1976 deaths
People from Quito
Ecuadorian people of Spanish descent
Social Christian Party (Ecuador) politicians
Presidents of Ecuador
Grand Crosses Special Class of the Order of Merit of the Federal Republic of Germany
University of Chile alumni